The 1997–98 NBA season was the 76ers 49th season in the National Basketball Association, and 35th season in Philadelphia. The 76ers selected Keith Van Horn from the University of Utah with the second overall pick in the 1997 NBA draft, but soon traded him to the New Jersey Nets in exchange for Jim Jackson, Eric Montross and top draft pick Tim Thomas, and signed free agent and former All-Star forward Terry Cummings during the off-season. In November, the Sixers acquired former All-Star forward Tom Chambers from the Phoenix Suns. However, after only playing just one game for the team, Chambers retired in December.

Under new head coach Larry Brown, the Sixers got off to a rough start losing their first five games. In late December, the team traded Montross along with Jerry Stackhouse to the Detroit Pistons in exchange for Theo Ratliff and Aaron McKie, then later on acquired Eric Snow from the Seattle SuperSonics in exchange for a draft pick. At midseason, they traded Jackson along with Clarence Weatherspoon to the Golden State Warriors in exchange for Joe Smith and Brian Shaw, while Cummings was dealt to the New York Knicks in exchange for Herb Williams, who was released by the 76ers, and re-signed with the Knicks. With a 14–31 record at the All-Star break, the Sixers showed improvement posting a 17–20 record for the remainder of the season, finishing last place in the Atlantic Division with a 31–51 record, missing the playoffs for seven straight seasons.

Second-year star Allen Iverson had a stellar season leading the team with 22.0 points, 6.2 assists and 2.2 steals per game, while Derrick Coleman provided the team with 17.6 points and 9.9 rebounds per game, but only played 59 games due to an irregular heartbeat, and an ankle injury, and Thomas contributed 11.0 points per game, and was named to the NBA All-Rookie Second Team. The start of the rebuilding of the franchise began with the acquisitions of Ratliff, McKie and Snow. These three players blended well with coach Brown's philosophy, and this would be the last season in which the Sixers missed the postseason until 2004. Following the season, Coleman signed as a free agent with the Charlotte Hornets, while Smith signed with the Minnesota Timberwolves, and Shaw and Mark Davis were both released to free agency.

For the season, the Sixers revealed a new primary logo with the team name "76ers" in gold, and changed their uniforms, replacing the red and blue colors with black and gold in their color scheme. The jerseys were slightly redesigned in 2000, while the logo remained in use until 2009.

Offseason

Draft picks

Roster

Regular season

Season standings

z - clinched division title
y - clinched division title
x - clinched playoff spot
° - did not make playoffs

Record vs. opponents

Player statistics

NOTE: Please write the players statistics in alphabetical order by last name.

Awards and records
 Tim Thomas, NBA All-Rookie Team 2nd Team

Transactions

References

See also
 1997–98 NBA season

Philadelphia 76ers seasons
Philadelphia
Philadelphia
Philadelphia